This is a partial list of active and extinct volcanoes in Saudi Arabia.

References 

Saudi Arabia
 
Volcanoes